Rourea is a genus of plants in the family Connaraceae. They are found worldwide across the tropics and subtropics.

Species
Currently accepted species include:

Rourea accrescens Forero
Rourea acutipetala Miq.
Rourea adenophora S.F.Blake
Rourea amazonica (Baker) Radlk.
Rourea antioquensis Cuatrec.
Rourea araguaensis Forero
Rourea aspleniifolia (G.Schellenb.) Jongkind
Rourea bahiensis Forero
Rourea balansana Baill.
Rourea blanchetiana (Progel) Kuhlm.
Rourea brachyandra F.Muell.
Rourea breviracemosa Gamble
Rourea calophylla (Gilg ex G.Schellenb.) Jongkind
Rourea calophylloides (G.Schellenb.) Jongkind
Rourea camptoneura Radlk.
Rourea carvalhoi Forero, Carbonó & L.A.Vidal
Rourea cassioides Hiern
Rourea caudata Planch.
Rourea chrysomalla Glaz. & G.Schellenb.
Rourea cnestidifolia G.Schellenb.
Rourea coccinea (Schumach. & Thonn.) Benth.
Rourea confundens (Leenh.) Jongkind
Rourea cuspidata Benth. ex Baker
Rourea discolor Baker
Rourea doniana Baker
Rourea duckei Huber
Rourea emarginata (Jack) Jongkind
Rourea erythrocalyx (Gilg ex G.Schellenb.) Jongkind
Rourea fluminensis (Gardner) Jongkind
Rourea foreroi Aymard & P.E.Berry
Rourea frutescens Aubl.
Rourea fulgens Planch.
Rourea gardneriana Planch.
Rourea glabra Kunth
Rourea glazioui G.Schellenb.
Rourea gracilis G.Schellenb.
Rourea grosourdyana Baill.
Rourea harmandiana Pierre
Rourea induta Planch.
Rourea kappleri Lanj.
Rourea krukovii Steyerm.
Rourea latifoliolata Standl. & L.O.Williams
Rourea laurifolia G.Schellenb.
Rourea ligulata Baker
Rourea luizalbertoi Forero, L.A.Vidal & Carbonó
Rourea macrocalyx Carbonó, Forero & L.A.Vidal
Rourea martiana Baker
Rourea microphylla (Hook. & Arn.) Planch.
Rourea mimosoides (Vahl) Planch.
Rourea minor (Gaertn.) Alston
Rourea myriantha Baill.
Rourea neglecta G.Schellenb.
Rourea obliquifoliolata Gilg
Rourea oligophlebia Merr.
Rourea omissa Forero
Rourea orientalis Baill.
Rourea ovalis (G.Schellenb.) Leenh.
Rourea paraensis Forero
Rourea parviflora Gilg
Rourea pinnata (Merr.) Veldkamp
Rourea pittieri S.F.Blake
Rourea prainiana Talbot
Rourea prancei Forero
Rourea psammophila Forero
Rourea pseudogardneriana Forero, Carbonó & L.A.Vidal
Rourea pseudospadicea G.Schellenb.
Rourea puberula Baker
Rourea pubescens (DC.) Radlk.
Rourea radlkoferiana K.Schum.
Rourea revoluta Planch.
Rourea rugosa Planch.
Rourea schippii Standl.
Rourea solanderi Baker
Rourea sprucei G.Schellenb.
Rourea stenopetala (Griff.) Hook.f.
Rourea suerrensis Donn.Sm.
Rourea surinamensis Miq.
Rourea tenuis G.Schellenb.
Rourea thomsonii (Baker) Jongkind
Rourea thonneri De Wild.
Rourea vulcanicola Forero

References

Connaraceae
Oxalidales genera